The clade Multicrustacea constitutes the largest superclass of crustaceans, containing approximately four-fifths of all described crustacean species, including crabs, lobsters, crayfish, shrimp, krill, prawns, woodlice,  barnacles, copepods, amphipods, mantis shrimp and others. The largest branch of multicrustacea is the class Malacostraca (see below).

Classification 

Superclass Multicrustacea Regier, Shultz, Zwick, Hussey, Ball, Wetzer, Martin & Cunningham, 2010 
 Family Priscansermarinidae Newman, 2004
 Class Copepoda Milne-Edwards, 1840 - Copepods  
 Infra-class Neocopepoda Huys & Boxshall, 1991
 Super-order Gymnoplea Giesbrecht, 1882
 Order Calanoida Sars GO, 1903
 Super-order Podoplea Giesbrecht, 1882
 Order Cyclopoida Burmeister, 1834
 Order Gelyelloida Huys, 1988
 Order Harpacticoida G. O. Sars, 1903
 Order Misophrioida Gurney, 1933
 Order Monstrilloida Sars, 1901
 Order Mormonilloida Boxshall,1979
 Order Polyarthra Lang, 1944  (=Canuelloida Khodami, Vaun MacArthur, Blanco-Bercial & Martinez Arbizu, 2017 )

 Order Siphonostomatoida Thorell, 1859
 Infra-class Progymnoplea Lang, 1948
 Order Platycopioida Fosshagen, 1985
 Class Thecostraca Gruvel, 1905
 Subclass Ascothoracida Lacaze-Duthiers, 1880
 Order Dendrogastrida Grygier, 1987
 Order Laurida Grygier, 1987
 Subclass Cirripedia Burmeister, 1834
 Infraclass Acrothoracica Gruvel, 1905
 Order Cryptophialida Kolbasov, Newman & Hoeg, 2009
 Order Lithoglyptida Kolbasov, Newman & Hoeg, 2009
 Infraclass Rhizocephala Müller, 1862
 Infraclass Thoracica Darwin, 1854
 Superorder Phosphatothoracica Gale, 2019
 Order Iblomorpha Buckeridge & Newman, 2006
 Order Eolepadomorpha Chan et al., 2021
 Superorder Thoracicalcarea Gale, 2015
 Order Balanomorpha Pilsbry, 1916
 Order Calanticomorpha Chan et al., 2021
 Order Pollicipedomorpha Chan et al., 2021
 Order Scalpellomorpha Buckeridge & Newman, 2006
 Order Verrucomorpha Pilsbry, 1916
 Order Archaeolepadomorpha Chan et al., 2021
 Order Brachylepadomorpha Withers, 1923
 Subclass Facetotecta Grygier, 1985
 Class Tantulocarida Boxshall & Lincoln, 1983
 Family Basipodellidae Boxshall & Lincoln, 1983
 Family Cumoniscidae Nierstrasz & Brender à Brandis, 1923 (=Deoterthridae Boxshall & Lincoln, 1987)
 Family Doryphallophoridae Huys, 1991
 Family Microdajidae Boxshall & Lincoln, 1987
 Family Onceroxenidae Huys, 1991
 Class Malacostraca Latreille, 1802
 Subclass Eumalacostraca Grobben, 1892
 Superorder Eucarida Calman, 1904
 Order Decapoda Latreille, 1802 - crabs, lobsters, crayfish, shrimp and prawns (includes former order Order Amphionidacea Williamson, 1973)
 Order Euphausiacea Dana, 1852 - krill
 Superorder Peracarida Calman, 1904
 Order Amphipoda Latreille, 1816 - amphipodes, gammares
 Order Bochusacea Gutu & Iliffe, 1998
 Order Cumacea Krøyer, 1846 - cumaceae
 Order Ingolfiellida Hansen, 1903
 Order Isopoda Latreille, 1817 - isopods (including clover)
 Order Lophogastrida Sars, 1870 - lophogastrides
 Order Mictacea Bowman, Garner, Hessler, Iliffe & Sanders, 1985 - mictacés
 Order Mysida Haworth, 1825 - mysidacés
  Order Pygocephalomorpha 
 Order Spelaeogriphacea Gordon, 1957 - spelaeogriphaceae
 Order Stygiomysida Tchindonova, 1981 - stygiomysides
 Order Tanaidacea Dana, 1849 - tanaidaceae
 Order Thermosbaenacea Monod, 1927 - thermosbaenaceae
 Superorder Syncarida Packard, 1879
 Order Anaspidacea Calman, 1904
 Order Bathynellacea Chappuis, 1915
  Order Palaeocaridacea Brooks, 1962 
 Subclass Hoplocarida Calman, 1904
 Order Stomatopoda Latreille, 1817 - shrimps-mantes
 Subclass Phyllocarida Packard, 1879
 Order Archaeostraca Claus, 1888
 Order Canadaspidida Novozhilov, 1960
 Order Hoplostraca Schram, 1973
 Order Hymenostraca Rolfe, 1969
 Order Leptostraca Claus, 1880
 Genus Nothozoe Barrande, 1872
Incertae sedis
 Order Cyclida 

Notes:

Image gallery

Taxonomic references 
 World Register of Marine Species : taxon Multicrustacea Regier Shultz Zwick Hussey, Ball, Wetzer, Martin & Cunningham, 2010 ( + class list  + orders list)
 Tree of Life Web Project : Multicrustacea
 Animal Diversity Web : Multicrustacea
 Catalog of Life : Multicrustacea
 IUCN : taxon Multicrustacea

Notes and references 
 ↑ World Register of Marine Species, accessed 13 April 2016

Crustaceans